Green Hill House is a historic plantation house located near Louisburg, Franklin County, North Carolina.   It was built prior to 1785, and is a -story, three bay, Georgian style frame dwelling.  It sits on a raised basement and has a rear shed extension. The house features a large double-shoulder brick end chimneys.  Green Hill (1741-1828)  was active in the Methodist movement and his house was the scene in 1785 of the first annual conference of the newly organized Methodist Episcopal Church, attended by Bishop Francis Asbury and Bishop Thomas Coke.

It was listed on the National Register of Historic Places in 1975.

References

External links

History of Methodism in the United States
Plantation houses in North Carolina
Historic American Buildings Survey in North Carolina
Houses on the National Register of Historic Places in North Carolina
Houses completed in 1788
Georgian architecture in North Carolina
Houses in Franklin County, North Carolina
National Register of Historic Places in Franklin County, North Carolina
1788 establishments in North Carolina